Honduran may refer to:
 Something of, from, or related to Honduras
 Hondurans, persons from Honduras or of Honduran descent
 Honduran population, see Ethnicity in Honduras
 Honduran Spanish, the language spoken in Honduras
 Honduran cuisine
 Honduran culture, see Culture of Honduras

See also 
 List of Hondurans
 
 

Language and nationality disambiguation pages